A total lunar eclipse will take place on September 19, 2043.

Visibility

Related lunar eclipses

Lunar year series

Tritos series

Saros series 

Lunar Saros 128 contains 15 total lunar eclipses between 1845 and 2097 (in years 1845, 1863, 1881, 1899, 1917, 1935, 1953, 1971, 1989, 2007, 2025, 2043, 2061, 2079 and 2097). Solar Saros 135 interleaves with this lunar saros with an event occurring every 9 years 5 days alternating between each saros series.

Half-Saros cycle
A lunar eclipse will be preceded and followed by solar eclipses by 9 years and 5.5 days (a half saros). This lunar eclipse is related to two annular solar eclipses of Solar Saros 135.

See also
List of lunar eclipses and List of 21st-century lunar eclipses

Notes

External links

2043-09
2043-09
2043 in science